Maximiliano Zárate Fagiuolo (born 4 February 1993) is an Argentine footballer who plays as a forward for Comunicaciones.

Career
Zárate began in the youth of Belgrano in 2007. He was promoted into the first-team in 2010 and was subsequently loaned out to Boca Río Gallegos of Torneo Argentino B but returned soon after following no appearances. In 2012, he joined Deportivo Maipú on a loan for the 2012–13 season. He played two times for the club in Torneo Argentino A. In June 2014, Zárate was loaned out for the third occasion, this time to Primera B Nacional team Sportivo Belgrano. He made his professional debut on 29 August in a 1–0 defeat to Temperley. Three further appearances followed as the club finished eleventh in Zone B.

On 23 August 2015, Zárate made his top-flight and Belgrano debut in an Argentine Primera División match with Rosario Central. On 3 February 2016, Flandria completed the loan signing of Zárate. He scored the first two goals of his career with Flandria in May 2016 in wins over Villa San Carlos and UAI Urquiza. He returned to Belgrano two months later after fourteen matches. Ahead of the 2016–17 Primera B Metropolitana campaign, Zárate agreed to join Comunicaciones in what would be his final loan away. Zárate went onto score seven goals in thirty-four games, including a hat-trick in a victory over Colegiales.

Four more goals followed for Comunicaciones in matches versus Talleres, Excursionistas, Tristán Suárez and Atlanta before, on 17 September 2017, Zárate departed Belgrano permanently as he agreed to join Torneo Federal A side San Lorenzo. His first appearance arrived two weeks later against Unión Villa Krause. Zárate terminated his contract with San Lorenzo on 3 March 2018. He spent the following nine months with Liga de Rio Cuarto team Acción Juvenil, prior to Zárate rejoining former club Comunicaciones on a free transfer in January 2019.

Career statistics
.

Honours
Flandria
 Primera B Metropolitana: 2016

References

External links

1993 births
Living people
Footballers from Córdoba, Argentina
Argentine footballers
Association football forwards
Primera Nacional players
Argentine Primera División players
Torneo Argentino A players
Primera B Metropolitana players
Torneo Federal A players
Club Atlético Belgrano footballers
Boca Río Gallegos footballers
Deportivo Maipú players
Sportivo Belgrano footballers
Flandria footballers
Club Comunicaciones footballers